Guelmim Airport  is an airport serving Guelmim, a city in the central Guelmim-Oued Noun region in Morocco. The airport served over 10,700 passengers in the year 2013.

Airlines and destinations
The following airlines operate regular scheduled and charter flights at Guelmim Airport:

References

Airports in Morocco